Courbevoie is a railway station serving the town Courbevoie, Hauts-de-Seine department, in the western suburbs of Paris, France. It is served by Transilien Line L services between Paris Gare Saint-Lazare and Gare de Saint-Cloud.

External links

 

Railway stations in Hauts-de-Seine
Railway stations in France opened in 1838